These are the list of personnel changes in the NBA from the 1965–66 NBA season.

Events

September 15, 1965
 The Boston Celtics sold Joe Strawder to the Detroit Pistons.

September 22, 1965
 The Baltimore Bullets traded Wali Jones to the Philadelphia 76ers for Red Kerr.

October 10, 1965
 The Baltimore Bullets traded Si Green to the Boston Celtics for a 1966 5th round draft pick (John Jones was later selected).

October 14, 1965
 The Los Angeles Lakers traded Dick Barnett to the New York Knicks for Bob Boozer.
 The San Francisco Warriors claimed Art Heyman on waivers from the New York Knicks.

October 20, 1965
 The Cincinnati Royals traded Bud Olsen and cash to the San Francisco Warriors for Connie Dierking and Art Heyman.

October 24, 1965
 The Philadelphia 76ers signed Gerry Ward as a free agent.

October 27, 1965
 The Philadelphia 76ers sold Ben Warley to the Baltimore Bullets.

October 28, 1965
 The Boston Celtics signed Don Nelson as a free agent.

November 2, 1965
 The Baltimore Bullets traded Walt Bellamy to the New York Knicks for Jim Barnes, Johnny Egan, Johnny Green and cash.

November 25, 1965
 The Detroit Pistons signed Bob Warlick as a free agent.

November 29, 1965
 The New York Knicks fired Harry Gallatin as head coach.
 The New York Knicks hired Dick McGuire as head coach.

December 2, 1965
 The Philadelphia 76ers claimed Art Heyman on waivers from the Cincinnati Royals.

December 8, 1965
 The Cincinnati Royals sold Bill Chielewski to the Detroit Pistons.

December 13, 1965
 The Boston Celtics signed Woody Sauldsberry as a free agent.

December 24, 1965
 The St. Louis Hawks traded John Tresvant and Chico Vaughn to the Detroit Pistons for Rod Thorn.

December 28, 1965
 The Detroit Pistons traded Joe Caldwell to the St. Louis Hawks for John Barnhill.

February 1, 1966
 The Los Angeles Lakers signed Tom Hoover as a free agent.

March 22, 1966
 The San Francisco Warriors fired Alex Hannum as head coach.
 The San Francisco Warriors hired Bill Sharman as head coach.

April 18, 1966
 The Boston Celtics hired Bill Russell as head coach.

April 28, 1966
 The Baltimore Bullets hired Mike Farmer as head coach.

May 1, 1966
 The Chicago Bulls drafted John Barnhill from the Detroit Pistons in the NBA expansion draft.
 The Chicago Bulls drafted Al Bianchi from the Philadelphia 76ers in the NBA expansion draft.
 The Chicago Bulls drafted Ron Bonham from the Boston Celtics in the NBA expansion draft.
 The Chicago Bulls drafted Nate Bowman from the Cincinnati Royals in the NBA expansion draft.
 The Chicago Bulls drafted Bob Boozer from the Los Angeles Lakers in the NBA expansion draft.
 The Chicago Bulls drafted Len Chappell from the New York Knicks in the NBA expansion draft.
 The Chicago Bulls drafted Barry Clemens from the New York Knicks in the NBA expansion draft.
 The Chicago Bulls drafted Red Kerr from the Baltimore Bullets in the NBA expansion draft.
 The Chicago Bulls drafted Jerry Sloan from the Baltimore Bullets in the NBA expansion draft.
 The Chicago Bulls drafted Tom Thacker from the Cincinnati Royals in the NBA expansion draft.
 The Chicago Bulls drafted John Thompson from the Boston Celtics in the NBA expansion draft.
 The Chicago Bulls drafted Gerry Ward from the Philadelphia 76ers in the NBA expansion draft.
 The Chicago Bulls drafted Keith Erickson from the San Francisco Warriors in the NBA expansion draft.
 The Chicago Bulls drafted Jim King from the Los Angeles Lakers in the NBA expansion draft.
 The Chicago Bulls drafted Don Kojis from the Detroit Pistons in the NBA expansion draft.
 The Chicago Bulls drafted McCoy McLemore from the San Francisco Warriors in the NBA expansion draft.
 The Chicago Bulls drafted Jeff Mullins from the St. Louis Hawks in the NBA expansion draft.
 The Chicago Bulls drafted Jim Washington from the St. Louis Hawks in the NBA expansion draft.

May 2, 1966
 The Philadelphia 76ers fired Dolph Schayes as head coach.
 The Philadelphia 76ers hired Alex Hannum as head coach.

May 3, 1966
 The Chicago Bulls hired Red Kerr as head coach.

May 11, 1966
 The Chicago Bulls sold Hank Finkel to the Los Angeles Lakers.

May 28, 1966
 Paul Seymour resigns as head coach for Baltimore Bullets.

June 7, 1966
 The San Francisco Warriors signed Bill McGill as a free agent.

References
NBA Transactions at NBA.com
1965-66 NBA Transactions| Basketball-Reference.com

Transactions
NBA transactions